Neonectria is a genus of fungi in the family Nectriaceae.

Species
Neonectria amamiensis
Neonectria betulae
Neonectria caespitosa
Neonectria cinnamomea
Neonectria confusa
Neonectria ditissima
Neonectria dumontii
Neonectria faginata
Neonectria fuckeliana
Neonectria galligena
Neonectria goroshankiana
Neonectria hederae
Neonectria hubeiensis
Neonectria lugdunensis
Neonectria macroconidialis
Neonectria magnoliae
Neonectria major
Neonectria neomacrospora
Neonectria phaeodisca
Neonectria platycephala
Neonectria punicea
Neonectria shennongjiana
Neonectria sinensis
Neonectria tokuoensis
Neonectria tokyoensis
Neonectria vandae
Neonectria verrucispora

External links
 

Nectriaceae genera